K-SIX Television is the name of a now-defunct communications company based in Corpus Christi, Texas. Its assets were sold to a joint venture of Alta Communications and Brian Brady, called Eagle Creek Broadcasting of Texas.

Former assets
KVTV 13 (CBS) Laredo, Texas (owned by Eagle Creek Broadcasting of Texas)
KZTV 10 (CBS) Corpus Christi, Texas (owned by SagamoreHill Broadcasting; operated by Cordillera Communications)
KSIX 1230 AM Corpus Christi, Texas (now owned by SportsradioCC, LLC)

Defunct broadcasting companies of the United States
Defunct companies based in Texas
Mass media in Laredo, Texas
Companies based in Corpus Christi, Texas